Punjabi, sometimes spelled Panjabi, is an Indo-Aryan language of the Punjab region of Pakistan and India. It has approximately 113 million native speakers.

Punjabi is the most widely-spoken first language in Pakistan, with 80.5 million native speakers as per the 2017 census, and the 11th most widely-spoken in India, with 31.1 million native speakers, as per the 2011 census. The language is spoken among a significant overseas diaspora, particularly in Saudi Arabia, the United Arab Emirates, Canada, the United Kingdom, and the United States.

In Pakistan, Punjabi is written using the Shahmukhi alphabet, based on the Perso-Arabic script; in India, it is written using the Gurmukhi alphabet, based on the Indic scripts. Punjabi is unusual among the Indo-Aryan languages and the broader Indo-European language family in its usage of lexical tone.

History

Etymology 
The word Punjabi (sometimes spelled Panjabi) has been derived from the word Panj-āb, Persian for 'Five Waters', referring to the five major eastern tributaries of the Indus River. The name of the region was introduced by the Turko-Persian conquerors of South Asia and was a translation of the Sanskrit name for the region, Panchanada, which means 'Land of the Five Rivers'.

The historical Punjab region, now divided between India and Pakistan, is defined physiographically by the Indus River and these five tributaries. One of the five, the Beas River, is a tributary of another, the Sutlej.

Origin

Punjabi developed from Prakrit languages and later  ('deviated' or 'non-grammatical speech') From 600 BC, Sanskrit developed as the standard literary and administrative language and Prakrit languages evolved into many regional languages in different parts of India. All these languages are called Prakrit languages collectively. Paishachi Prakrit was one of these Prakrit languages, which was spoken in north and north-western India and Punjabi developed from this Prakrit. Later in northern India Paishachi Prakrit gave rise to Paishachi Aparbhsha, a descendant of Prakrit. Punjabi emerged as an Apabhramsha, a degenerated form of Prakrit, in the 7th century AD and became stable by the 10th century. The earliest writings in Punjabi belong to Nath Yogi era from 9th to 14th century. The language of these compositions is morphologically closer to Shauraseni Apbhramsa, though vocabulary and rhythm is surcharged with extreme colloquialism and folklore. The precursor stage of Punjabi between the 10th and 16th centuries is termed 'Old Punjabi', whilst the stage between the 16th and 19th centuries is termed as 'Mediaeval Punjabi'.

Arabic and Persian influences

The Arabic and modern Persian influence in the historical Punjab region began with the late first millennium Muslim conquests on the Indian subcontinent. Many Persian and Arabic words were incorporated in Punjabi. So Punjabi relies heavily on Persian and Arabic words which are used with a liberal approach to language. After the fall of the Sikh empire, Urdu was made the official language of Punjab (in Pakistani Punjab, it is still the primary official language), and influenced the language as well.

Later, it was lexically influenced by Portuguese  (words like ), Greek (words like ), Chagatai (words like ), Japanese (words like ), Chinese (words like ) and English (words like ), though these influences have been minor in comparison to Persian and Arabic.

Note: In more formal contexts, hypercorrect Sanskritized versions of these words (ਪ੍ਰਧਾਨ pradhān for ਪਰਧਾਨ pardhān and ਪਰਿਵਾਰ parivār for ਪਰਵਾਰ parvār) may be used.

Modern times 
Modern Punjabi emerged in the 19th century from the Mediaeval Punjabi stage. Modern Punjabi is spoken in many dialects. The Majhi dialect has been adopted as standard Punjabi in India and Pakistan for education and mass media. The Majhi dialect originated in the Majha region of the Punjab.

In India, Punjabi is written in the Gurmukhī script in offices, schools, and media. Gurmukhi is the official standard script for Punjabi, though it is often unofficially written in the Latin scripts due to influence from English, one of India's two primary official languages at the Union-level.

In Pakistan, Punjabi is generally written using the Shahmukhī script, which in literary standards, is identical to the Urdu alphabet, however various attempts have been made to create certain, distinct characters from a modification of the Persian Nastaʿlīq characters to represent Punjabi phonology, not already found in the Urdu alphabet. In Pakistan, Punjabi loans technical words from Persian and Arabic languages, just like Urdu does.

Geographic distribution 
Punjabi is the most widely spoken language in Pakistan, the eleventh-most widely spoken in India, and also present in the Punjabi diaspora in various countries.

Pakistan 
Punjabi is the most widely spoken language in Pakistan, being the native language of 80.5 million people, or approximately 39% of the country's population.

Beginning with the 1981 census, speakers of Saraiki and Hindko were no longer included in the total numbers for Punjabi, which explains the apparent decrease.

India 

Punjabi is the official language of the Indian state of Punjab, and has the status of an additional official language in Haryana and Delhi. Some of its major urban centres in northern India are Amritsar, Ludhiana, Chandigarh, Jalandhar, Ambala, Patiala, Bathinda, Hoshiarpur, Firozpur and Delhi.

In the 2011 census of India,  million reported their language as Punjabi. The census publications group this with speakers of related "mother tongues" like Bagri and Bhateali to arrive at the figure of  million.

Punjabi diaspora 

Punjabi is also spoken as a minority language in several other countries where Punjabi people have emigrated in large numbers, such as the United States, Australia, the United Kingdom, and Canada.

There were 0.67 million native Punjabi speakers in Canada in 2021, 0.3 million in the United Kingdom in 2011, 0.28 million in the United States and smaller numbers in other countries.

Major dialects

Standard Punjabi
Standard Punjabi sometimes referred to as Majhi in India or simply Punjabi, is the most widespread and largest dialect of Punjabi. It first developed in the 12th century and gained prominence when Sufi poets such as Shah Hussain, Bulleh Shah among others began to use the Lahore/Amritsar spoken dialect with infused Persian vocabulary in their works in the Shahmukhi script. Later the Gurmukhi script was developed based on Standard Punjabi by the Sikh Gurus.

In Pakistan, the Standard Punjabi dialect is not referred to as the 'Majhi dialect', which may be considered as 'Indian terminology', rather simply as 'Standard Punjabi'. This dialect is widely used in the TV and entertainment industry, which is mainly produced in Lahore.

Phonology 

While a vowel length distinction between short and long vowels exists, reflected in modern Gurmukhi orthographical conventions, it is secondary to the vowel quality contrast between centralised vowels  and peripheral vowels  in terms of phonetic significance.

The peripheral vowels have nasal analogues.

Note: for the tonal stops, refer to the next section about Tone.

The well-established phoneme  may be realised allophonically as the voiceless retroflex fricative  in learned clusters with retroflexes. The retroflex lateral is most commonly analysed as an approximant as opposed to a flap.

Tone 
Unusually for an Indo-Aryan language, Punjabi distinguishes lexical tones. Three tones are distinguished in Punjabi (some sources have described these as tone contours, given in parentheses): low (high-falling), high (low-rising), and level (neutral or middle). The transcriptions and tone annotations in the examples below are based on those provided in Punjabi University, Patiala’s Punjabi-English Dictionary.

Level tone is found in about 75% of words and is described by some as absence of tone. There are also some words which are said to have rising tone in the first syllable and falling in the second. (Some writers describe this as a fourth tone.) However, a recent acoustic study of six Punjabi speakers in the United States found no evidence of a separate falling tone following a medial consonant.
 / , móḍà (rising-falling), "shoulder"

It is considered that these tones arose when voiced aspirated consonants lost their aspiration. At the beginning of a word, they became voiceless unaspirated consonants followed by a high-falling tone; medially or finally they became voiced unaspirated consonants, preceded by a low-rising tone. (The development of a high-falling tone apparently did not take place in every word, but only in those which historically had a long vowel.)

The presence of an [h] (although the [h] is now silent or very weakly pronounced except word-initially) word-finally (and sometimes medially) also often causes a rising tone before it, for example  "tea".

The Gurmukhi script which was developed in the 16th century has separate letters for voiced aspirated sounds, so it is thought that the change in pronunciation of the consonants and development of tones may have taken place since that time.

Some other languages in Pakistan have also been found to have tonal distinctions, including Burushaski, Gujari, Hindko, Kalami, Shina, and Torwali.

Grammar 

Punjabi has a canonical word order of SOV (subject–object–verb). Function words are largely postpositions marking grammatical case on a preceding nominal.

Punjabi distinguishes two genders, two numbers, and six cases of direct, oblique, vocative, ablative, locative, and instrumental. The ablative occurs only in the singular, in free variation with oblique case plus ablative postposition, and the locative and instrumental are usually confined to set adverbial expressions.

Adjectives, when declinable, are marked for the gender, number, and case of the nouns they qualify. There is also a T-V distinction.
Upon the inflectional case is built a system of particles known as postpositions, which parallel English's prepositions. It is their use with a noun or verb that is what necessitates the noun or verb taking the oblique case, and it is with them that the locus of grammatical function or "case-marking" then lies. 
The Punjabi verbal system is largely structured around a combination of aspect and tense/mood. Like the nominal system, the Punjabi verb takes a single inflectional suffix, and is often followed by successive layers of elements like auxiliary verbs and postpositions to the right of the lexical base.

Vocabulary 
Being an Indo-Aryan language, the core vocabulary of Punjabi consists of tadbhav words inherited from Sanskrit. It contains many loanwords from Persian and Arabic.

Writing systems 

The Punjabi language is written in multiple scripts (a phenomenon known as synchronic digraphia). Each of the major scripts currently in use is typically associated with a particular religious group, although the association is not absolute or exclusive.
In India, Punjabi Sikhs use Gurmukhi, a script of the Brahmic family, which has official status in the state of Punjab. In Pakistan, Punjabi Muslims use Shahmukhi, a variant of the Perso-Arabic script and closely related to the Urdu alphabet. The Punjabi Hindus in India had a preference for Devanagari, another Brahmic script also used for Hindi, and in the first decades since independence raised objections to the uniform adoption of Gurmukhi in the state of Punjab, but most have now switched to Gurmukhi and so the use of Devanagari is rare. Often in literature, Pakistani Punjabi (written in Shahmukhi) is referred as Western-Punjabi (or West-Punjabi) and Indian Punjabi (written in Gurmukhi) is referred as Eastern-Punjabi (or East-Punjabi), although the underlying language is the same with a very slight shift in vocabulary towards Islamic and Sikh words respectively.

Historically, various local Brahmic scripts including Laṇḍā and its descendants were also in use.

The Punjabi Braille is used by the visually impaired.

Sample text 
This sample text was taken from the Punjabi Wikipedia article on Lahore.

Gurmukhi

ਲਹੌਰ ਪਾਕਿਸਤਾਨੀ ਪੰਜਾਬ ਦੀ ਰਾਜਧਾਨੀ ਹੈ। ਲੋਕ ਗਿਣਤੀ ਦੇ ਨਾਲ ਕਰਾਚੀ ਤੋਂ ਬਾਅਦ ਲਹੌਰ ਦੂਜਾ ਸਭ ਤੋਂ ਵੱਡਾ ਸ਼ਹਿਰ ਹੈ। ਲਹੌਰ ਪਾਕਿਸਤਾਨ ਦਾ ਸਿਆਸੀ, ਰਹਤਲੀ ਅਤੇ ਪੜ੍ਹਾਈ ਦਾ ਗੜ੍ਹ ਹੈ ਅਤੇ ਇਸੇ ਲਈ ਇਹਨੂੰ ਪਾਕਿਸਤਾਨ ਦਾ ਦਿਲ ਵੀ ਕਿਹਾ ਜਾਂਦਾ ਹੈ। ਲਹੌਰ ਰਾਵੀ ਦਰਿਆ ਦੇ ਕੰਢੇ 'ਤੇ ਵਸਦਾ ਹੈ। ਇਸਦੀ ਲੋਕ ਗਿਣਤੀ ਇੱਕ ਕਰੋੜ ਦੇ ਨੇੜੇ ਹੈ। 

Shahmukhi (the sample text is not word-for-word the same)

Transliteration

Lahaur Pākistānī Panjāb dī rājtā̀ni/dā dārul hakūmat ài. Lok giṇtī de nāḷ Karācī tõ bāad Lahaur dūjā sáb tõ vaḍḍā šáir ài. Lahaur Pākistān dā siāsī, rátalī ate paṛā̀ī dā gáṛ ài te ise laī ínū̃ Pākistān dā dil vī kihā jāndā ài. Lahaur Rāvī dariā de káṇḍè te vasdā ài. Isdī lok giṇtī ikk karoṛ de neṛe ài.

IPA

Translation

Lahore is the capital city of Pakistani Punjab. After Karachi, Lahore is the second largest city. Lahore is Pakistan's political, cultural, and educational hub, and so it is also said to be the heart of Pakistan. Lahore lies on the bank of the Ravi River. Its population is close to ten million people.

Literature development

Medieval period 
Fariduddin Ganjshakar (1179–1266) is generally recognised as the first major poet of the Punjabi language. Roughly from the 12th century to the 19th century, many great Sufi saints and poets preached in the Punjabi language, the most prominent being Bulleh Shah. Punjabi Sufi poetry also developed under Shah Hussain (1538–1599), Sultan Bahu (1630–1691), Shah Sharaf (1640–1724),  Ali Haider (1690–1785), Waris Shah (1722–1798), Saleh Muhammad Safoori (1747–1826), Mian Muhammad Baksh (1830–1907) and Khwaja Ghulam Farid (1845–1901).
The Sikh religion originated in the 15th century in the Punjab region and Punjabi is the predominant language spoken by Sikhs. Most portions of the Guru Granth Sahib use the Punjabi language written in Gurmukhi, though Punjabi is not the only language used in Sikh scriptures.

The Janamsakhis, stories on the life and legend of Guru Nanak (1469–1539), are early examples of Punjabi prose literature.

The Punjabi language is famous for its rich literature of qisse, most of which are about love, passion, betrayal, sacrifice, social values and a common man's revolt against a larger system. The qissa of Heer Ranjha by Waris Shah (1706–1798) is among the most popular of Punjabi qissas. Other popular stories include Sohni Mahiwal by Fazal Shah, Mirza Sahiban by Hafiz Barkhudar (1658–1707), Sassui Punnhun by Hashim Shah (c. 1735–c. 1843), and Qissa Puran Bhagat by Qadaryar (1802–1892).
Heroic ballads known as Vaar enjoy a rich oral tradition in Punjabi. Famous Vaars are Chandi di Var (1666–1708), Nadir Shah Di Vaar by Najabat and the Jangnama of Shah Mohammad (1780–1862).

Modern period 

The Victorian novel, Elizabethan drama, free verse and Modernism entered Punjabi literature through the introduction of British education during the Raj. Nanak Singh (1897–1971), Vir Singh, Ishwar Nanda, Amrita Pritam (1919–2005), Puran Singh (1881–1931), Dhani Ram Chatrik (1876–1957), Diwan Singh (1897–1944) and Ustad Daman (1911–1984), Mohan Singh (1905–78) and Shareef Kunjahi are some legendary Punjabi writers of this period.
After independence of Pakistan and India Najm Hossein Syed, Fakhar Zaman and Afzal Ahsan Randhawa, Shafqat Tanvir Mirza, Ahmad Salim, and Najm Hosain Syed, Munir Niazi, Ali Arshad Mir, Pir Hadi Abdul Mannan enriched Punjabi literature in Pakistan, whereas Jaswant Singh Kanwal (1919–2020), Amrita Pritam (1919–2005), Jaswant Singh Rahi (1930–1996), Shiv Kumar Batalvi (1936–1973), Surjit Patar (1944–) and Pash (1950–1988) are some of the more prominent poets and writers from India.

Status
Despite Punjabi's rich literary history, it was not until 1947 that it would be recognised as an official language. Previous governments in the area of the Punjab had favoured Persian, Hindustani, or even earlier standardised versions of local registers as the language of the court or government. After the annexation of the Sikh Empire by the British East India Company following the Second Anglo-Sikh War in 1849, the British policy of establishing a uniform language for administration was expanded into the Punjab. The British Empire employed Urdu in its administration of North-Central and Northwestern India, while in the North-East of India, Bengali language was used as the language of administration. Despite its lack of official sanction, the Punjabi language continued to flourish as an instrument of cultural production, with rich literary traditions continuing until modern times. The Sikh religion, with its Gurmukhi script, played a special role in standardising and providing education in the language via Gurdwaras, while writers of all religions continued to produce poetry, prose, and literature in the language.

In India, Punjabi is one of the 22 scheduled languages of India. It is the first official language of the Indian State of Punjab. Punjabi also has second language official status in Delhi along with Urdu, and in Haryana.

In Pakistan, no regional ethnic language has been granted official status at the national level, and as such Punjabi is not an official language at the national level, even though it is the most spoken language in Pakistan. It is, however, the official provincial language of Punjab, Pakistan, the second largest and the most populous province of Pakistan as well as in Islamabad Capital Territory. The only two official languages in Pakistan are Urdu and English.

In Pakistan

When Pakistan was created in 1947,  despite Punjabi being the majority language in West Pakistan and Bengali the majority in East Pakistan and Pakistan as whole, English and Urdu were chosen as the national languages. The selection of Urdu was due to its association with South Asian Muslim nationalism and because the leaders of the new nation wanted a unifying national language instead of promoting one ethnic group's language over another. Broadcasting in Punjabi language by Pakistan Broadcasting Corporation decreased on TV and radio after 1947.  Article 251 of the Constitution of Pakistan declares that these two languages would be the only official languages at the national level, while provincial governments would be allowed to make provisions for the use of other languages. However, in the 1950s the constitution was amended to include the Bengali language. Eventually, Punjabi was granted status as a provincial language in Punjab Province, while the Sindhi language was given official status in 1972 after 1972 Language violence in Sindh.

Despite gaining official recognition at the provincial level, Punjabi is not a language of instruction for primary or secondary school students in Punjab Province (unlike Sindhi and Pashto in other provinces). Pupils in secondary schools can choose the language as an elective, while Punjabi instruction or study remains rare in higher education. One notable example is the teaching of Punjabi language and literature by the University of the Punjab in Lahore which began in 1970 with the establishment of its Punjabi Department.

In the cultural sphere, there are many books, plays, and songs being written or produced in the Punjabi-language in Pakistan. Until the 1970s, there were a large number of Punjabi-language films being produced by the Lollywood film industry, however since then Urdu has become a much more dominant language in film production. Additionally, television channels in Punjab Province (centred on the Lahore area) are broadcast in Urdu. The preeminence of Urdu in both broadcasting and the Lollywood film industry is seen by critics as being detrimental to the health of the language.

The use of Urdu and English as the near exclusive languages of broadcasting, the public sector, and formal education have led some to fear that Punjabi in Pakistan is being relegated to a low-status language and that it is being denied an environment where it can flourish. Several prominent educational leaders, researchers, and social commentators have echoed the opinion that the intentional promotion of Urdu and the continued denial of any official sanction or recognition of the Punjabi language amounts to a process of "Urdu-isation" that is detrimental to the health of the Punjabi language In August 2015, the Pakistan Academy of Letters, International Writer's Council (IWC) and World Punjabi Congress (WPC) organised the Khawaja Farid Conference and demanded that a Punjabi-language university should be established in Lahore and that Punjabi language should be declared as the medium of instruction at the primary level. In September 2015, a case was filed in Supreme Court of Pakistan against Government of Punjab, Pakistan as it did not take any step to implement the Punjabi language in the province. Additionally, several thousand Punjabis gather in Lahore every year on International Mother Language Day. Thinktanks, political organisations, cultural projects, and individuals also demand authorities at the national and provincial level to promote the use of the language in the public and official spheres.

In India
At the federal level, Punjabi has official status via the Eighth Schedule to the Indian Constitution, earned after the Punjabi Suba movement of the 1950s. At the state level, Punjabi is the sole official language of the state of Punjab, while it has secondary official status in the states of Haryana and Delhi. In 2012, it was also made additional official language of West Bengal in areas where the population exceeds 10% of a particular block, sub-division or district.

Both union and state laws specify the use of Punjabi in the field of education. The state of Punjab uses the Three Language Formula, and Punjabi is required to be either the medium of instruction, or one of the three languages learnt in all schools in Punjab. Punjabi is also a compulsory language in Haryana, and other states with a significant Punjabi speaking minority are required to offer Punjabi medium education.

There are vibrant Punjabi language movie and news industries in India, however Punjabi serials have had a much smaller presence within the last few decades in television due to market forces. Despite Punjabi having far greater official recognition in India, where the Punjabi language is officially admitted in all necessary social functions, while in Pakistan it is used only in a few radio and TV programs, attitudes of the English-educated elite towards the language are ambivalent as they are in neighbouring Pakistan. There are also claims of state apathy towards the language in non-Punjabi majority areas like Haryana and Delhi.

Advocacy
Punjabi University was established on 30 April 1962, and is only the second university in the world to be named after a language, after Hebrew University of Jerusalem. The Research Centre for Punjabi Language Technology, Punjabi University, Patiala is working for development of core technologies for Punjabi, Digitisation of basic materials, online Punjabi teaching, developing software for office use in Punjabi, providing common platform to Punjabi cyber community. Punjabipedia, an online encyclopaedia was also launched by Patiala university in 2014.
The Dhahan Prize was created to award literary works produced in Punjabi around the world. The Prize encourages new writing by awarding $25,000 CDN annually to one "best book of fiction" published in either of the two Punjabi scripts, Gurmukhi or Shahmukhi. Two second prizes of $5,000 CDN are also awarded, with the provision that both scripts are represented among the three winners. The Dhahan Prize is awarded by Canada India Education Society (CIES).

Governmental academies and institutes
The Punjabi Sahit academy, Ludhiana, established in 1954 is supported by the Punjab state government and works exclusively for promotion of the Punjabi language, as does the Punjabi academy in Delhi. The Jammu and Kashmir academy of art, culture and literature in Jammu and Kashmir UT, India works for Punjabi and other regional languages like Urdu, Dogri, Gojri etc. Institutions in neighbouring states as well as in Lahore, Pakistan also advocate for the language.

Software
Software is available for the Punjabi language on almost all platforms. This software is mainly in the Gurmukhi script. Nowadays, nearly all Punjabi newspapers, magazines, journals, and periodicals are composed on computers via various Punjabi software programmes, the most widespread of which is InPage Desktop Publishing package. Microsoft has included Punjabi language support in all the new versions of Windows and both Windows Vista, Microsoft Office 2007, 2010 and 2013, are available in Punjabi through the Language Interface Pack support. Most Linux Desktop distributions allow the easy installation of Punjabi support and translations as well. Apple implemented the Punjabi language keyboard across Mobile devices. Google also provides many applications in Punjabi, like Google Search, Google Translate and Google Punjabi Input Tools.

Gallery

See also 

 Punjabi Language Movement
 Languages of Pakistan
 Languages of India
 List of Indian languages by total speakers
 List of Punjabi-language newspapers
 Khalsa bole – coded language of Nihang Sikhs largely based on Punjabi
 Punjabi cinema

Notes

References

Citations

Sources 

 .
 .
 
 .
.
.
.

Further reading 
 Bhatia, Tej. 1993 and 2010. Punjabi : a cognitive-descriptive grammar. London: Routledge. Series: Descriptive grammars.
 Gill H.S. [Harjit Singh] and Gleason, H.A. 1969. A reference grammar of Punjabi. Revised edition. Patiala, Punjab, India: Languages Department, Punjab University.
 Chopra, R. M., Perso-Arabic Words in Punjabi, in: Indo-Iranica Vol.53 (1–4).
 Chopra, R. M.., The Legacy of The Punjab, 1997, Punjabee Bradree, Calcutta.
 Singh, Chander Shekhar (2004). Punjabi Prosody: The Old Tradition and The New Paradigm. Sri Lanka: Polgasowita: Sikuru Prakasakayo.
 Singh, Chander Shekhar (2014). Punjabi Intonation: An Experimental Study. Muenchen: LINCOM EUROPA.

External links 
 

 
 English to Punjabi Dictionary 

Punjab
 
Fusional languages
Official languages of India
Languages of Pakistan
 
Languages officially written in Indic scripts
Punjabi culture
Subject–object–verb languages
Tonal languages in non-tonal families
Languages with own distinct writing systems
Greater Punjabi languages and dialects
Sahitya Akademi recognised languages